Ramleela is a Hindu  re-enactment of the life of Rama.

Ramleela or Ram Leela may also refer to:
Ram-Leela, a 2013 Hindi film
Ramleela (2015 Kannada film)
Ram Leela (2015 Telugu film)
Ramleela – Ajay Devgn Ke Saath, a mythological musical drama television series

See also
Ramaleela, a 2017 Malayalam film